The Redoubt Duijnhoop was a square demi-bastioned clay and timber Redoubt built fort constructed at the mouth of the Salt River, leading into Table Bay, South Africa in January–February 1654.  It formed part of the defences of the Vereenigde Oost-Indische Compagnie 'VOC' replenishment station, which had been established under Jan van Riebeeck in 1652. The purpose of the station was to supply ships travelling between the Netherlands and the Dutch East Indies.

The redoubt was armed with two 12-pounder guns, and on 22 April 1654, Van Riebeeck informed the VOC's directors that "in addition to the Fort de Goede Hoop, a redoubt named Duijnhoop standing at the Salt River for the protection and reinforcement of this Table Bay, has been fully placed in a position of defence."

In addition to covering the approach to the Salt River mouth, Duijnhoop served as a signalling station to warn the Fort of approaching ships.

By 1661, Duijnhoop had been abandoned, and fallen into disrepair.  It was repaired after a warning that a French fleet might pass the Cape, and a second redoubt, named Santhoop, was built nearby.  By 1666, however, both had been allowed to fall into disrepair again.  Duijnhoop was demolished in 1672.

Duijnhoop is sometimes confused with the Fort de Goede Hoop.

See also
 Castle of Good Hope
 Fort de Goede Hoop
 Fortifications of the Cape Peninsula
 List of Castles and Fortifications in South Africa

References

 Emms, M.  "Fortifications of the Cape of Good Hope" in Lantern (June 1976).
 Ras, A.C. (1959).  Die Kasteel en Ander Vroëe Kaapse Vestingwerke.
 Seeman, U.A. (1997).  Fortifications of the Cape Peninsula 1647-1829, Published by Castle Military Museum, Cape Town

External links
 Contemporary maps and images of the fort in the Atlas of Mutual Heritage

History of Cape Town
Military history of South Africa
Forts in South Africa
Redoubts
1654 establishments in the Dutch Empire
Buildings and structures demolished in the 17th century
Demolished buildings and structures in South Africa